Francis William Maine (15 September 1937 – 29 September 2018) was a Canadian chemical engineer, a scientist, entrepreneur, and politician who was a member of the Liberal Party of Canada. He was his party's representative in the House of Commons of Canada. Along with serving as a Member of Parliament, Maine served as Parliamentary Secretary to the Minister of State for Science and Technology.

Maine immigrated to Canada from England at the age of 10, and studied Engineering Chemistry at Queen's University. Awarded an Athlone Fellowship, he studied Chemistry at the University of Cambridge, earning his PhD.  While at Cambridge, Maine earned his Blue as captain of the University of Cambridge Judo team, also competing for Britain.  Upon returning to Canada, he worked as a polymer chemist, and became head of Reinforced Plastics R&D at Fibreglass Canada.

He was elected at the Wellington riding in
the 1974 general election, serving in the 30th Canadian Parliament. A key issue for Maine was the role science and innovation policy could play in building Canada’s knowledge economy. Following realignment of ridings, Maine was defeated at the Guelph electoral district in the 1979 federal election by Albert Fish of the Progressive Conservative party. Maine ran for federal Parliament again at the Guelph—Wellington riding, this time as an independent candidate in the 1993 election, but was defeated.

After politics, Maine returned to plastics and composites R&D, but this time as a scientist-entrepreneur. He co-invented and commercialized oriented polymer products.
He also served on the Science Council of Canada.

He died on Sept 29, 2018 in Guelph, leaving behind his wife of nearly 60 years, Mary-Eva Maine, 4 children, and 6 grandchildren.

His daughter is academic Elicia Maine.  His granddaughter is cyclist Katherine Maine.

References

https://www.lipad.ca/members/record/a181579e-08c7-4a7c-8b99-f2e691029d3d/1/

External links
 

1937 births
2018 deaths
Canadian chemists
Engineers from Ontario
Members of the House of Commons of Canada from Ontario
Liberal Party of Canada MPs
Canadian chemical engineers
20th-century Canadian engineers
21st-century Canadian engineers
People from Hayes, Bromley
Scientists from Ontario
20th-century Canadian scientists
21st-century Canadian scientists
20th-century chemists
21st-century chemists
English emigrants to Canada